An emphyteutic lease is a type of real estate contract specifying that the lessee must improve the property with construction.  The term is commonly used in Quebec and France.  These sorts of leases are usually associated with government properties.

Rwanda adopted an emphyteutic leasing system in 2013, offering 99-year leases for agricultural land to its citizens, and 20-year leases for residential land.

See also
Emphyteusis

References

External links
 Treasury board of Canada Real Property Lexicon

Real estate in France
Property law legal terminology
Law of obligations
Real estate in Canada
Real estate in Rwanda